Felix Khonde Mambimbi (born 18 January 2001) is a Swiss professional footballer who plays as a forward for Dutch club Cambuur on loan from Young Boys.

Club career
Mambimbi made his Swiss Super League debut for Young Boys on 17 February 2019 in a game against Zürich, as a 90th-minute substitute for Moumi Ngamaleu. Mambimbi has represented Young Boys in the UEFA Champions League playing teams such as Manchester United, Villarreal and Atalanta.

On 31 August 2022, Mambimbi joined Cambuur in the Netherlands on a season-long loan.

International career
Born in Switzerland, Mambimbi is of Congelese descent. He is a youth international for Switzerland and has played for the Swiss U16, U17, U19 and U21 teams. Most recently, Mambimbi played for the Swiss team during qualification for the UEFA Under 21's European Championship.

Career statistics

Club

Honours 
Young Boys
 Swiss Super League: 2018–19, 2019–20
 Swiss Cup: 2019–20

References

External links
 
 SFV Profile

2001 births
People from Fribourg
Sportspeople from the canton of Fribourg
Swiss people of Democratic Republic of the Congo descent
Living people
Swiss men's footballers
Association football forwards
Switzerland youth international footballers
Switzerland under-21 international footballers
BSC Young Boys players
SC Cambuur players
Swiss 1. Liga (football) players
Swiss Super League players
Eredivisie players
Swiss expatriate footballers
Expatriate footballers in the Netherlands
Swiss expatriate sportspeople in the Netherlands